Mark DeSantis (born January 12, 1972) is a Canadian professional ice hockey coach and former player.

Career 
DeSantis was the head coach for the Rapid City Rush of the ECHL from midway into the 2015–16 season until  the end of the 2016–17 season. He was the head coach of the Fayetteville FireAntz of the Southern Professional Hockey League for the 2012–13 season and of the Brampton Beast of the Central Hockey League for the 2013–14 season.

Career statistics

Awards and honours

References

External links

1972 births
Living people
Amarillo Gorillas players
Anaheim Bullfrogs players
Augusta Lynx players
Baltimore Bandits players
Basingstoke Bison players
Canadian ice hockey coaches
Canadian ice hockey defencemen
Cornwall Royals (OHL) players
Grand Rapids Griffins players
Greensboro Monarchs players
Jacksonville Lizard Kings players
Louisiana IceGators (ECHL) players
New Mexico Scorpions (WPHL) players
Newmarket Royals players
Port Huron Icehawks players
Providence Bruins players
Rapid City Rush players
San Antonio Dragons players
San Antonio Iguanas players
San Diego Gulls (IHL) players
Toledo Storm players
Ice hockey people from Ontario
Sportspeople from Brampton
Canadian expatriate ice hockey players in England
Canadian expatriate ice hockey players in the United States